Saldula pallipes is a species of shore bug in the family Saldidae. It is found in Africa, the Caribbean, Europe and Northern Asia (excluding China), Central America, North America, and South America.

Subspecies
These two subspecies belong to the species Saldula pallipes:
 Saldula pallipes dimidiata (Curtis, 1835)
 Saldula pallipes pallipes (Fabricius, 1794)

References

External links

 

Articles created by Qbugbot
Insects described in 1794
Saldoidini